The Commanders–Eagles rivalry is a rivalry between the Washington Commanders, formerly known as the Redskins, and Philadelphia Eagles of the National Football League. The rivalry began in 1934, during the time the Redskins played in Boston.

The rivalry is one of the most heated rivalries in the NFL, and has featured some memorable moments in NFL history. The rivalry is most historically notable from the "Body Bag Game", where the Eagles injured nine Redskins players in a game in 1990. In 2010, the Eagles scored 59 points in three quarters against the Redskins in the Monday Night Massacre game.

The Commanders lead the all-time series 89–83–6. Washington has won five NFL championships including three Super Bowls, while the Eagles have won four NFL championships including one Super Bowl.  The teams have met once in the playoffs, in which the Redskins avenged the Body Bag Game by defeating the Eagles 20–6 in the 1990 NFC Wild Card round.

The rivalry can be attributed to the close proximity of Philadelphia and Washington, D.C.  It is mirrored by the National Hockey League rivalry between the Washington Capitals and Philadelphia Flyers.

Season-by-season results 

|-
| 
| style="| 
| style="| Redskins  14–7
| style="| Redskins  6–0
| Redskins  2–0
| 
|-
| 
| style="| 
| no game
| style="| Eagles  7–6
| Redskins  2–1
| Marks the only time both teams have not met in two regular season meetings.
|-
| 
| style="| 
| style="| Redskins  26–3
| style="| Redskins  17–7
| Redskins  4–1
| Redskins lose 1936 NFL Championship.
|-
| 
| Tie 1–1
| style="| Redskins  10–7
| style="| Eagles  14–0
| Redskins  5–2
| Redskins move from Boston to Washington, win 1937 NFL Championship.
|-
| 
| style="| 
| style="| Redskins  26–23
| style="| Redskins  20–14
| Redskins  7–2
| 
|-
| 
| style="| 
| style="| Redskins  7–0
| style="| Redskins  7–6
| Redskins  9–2
|

|-
| 
| style="| 
| style="| Redskins  34–17
| style="| Redskins  13–6
| Redskins  11–2
| Eagles move to Connie Mack Stadium, Redskins lose 1940 NFL Championship.
|-
| 
| style="| 
| style="| Redskins  21–17
| style="| Redskins  20–14
| Redskins  13–2
| 
|-
| 
| style="| 
| style="| Redskins  14–10
| style="| Redskins  30–27
| Redskins  15–2
| Redskins win 11 straight meetings (1937-42) and eight straight meetings in Philadelphia (1934-42).  Redskins win 1942 NFL Championship.
|-
| 
| style="| 
| Tie  14–14
| style="| "Steagles"  27–14
| Redskins  15–3–1
| Eagles and Pittsburgh Steelers merge for the 1943 season to become the "Steagles," as both teams lost many players to military service during World War II. Redskins lose 1943 NFL Championship.
|-
| 
| style="| 
| Tie  31–31
| style="| Eagles  37–7
| Redskins  15–4–2
| 
|-
| 
| Tie 1–1
| style="| Eagles  16–0
| style="| Redskins  24–14
| Redskins  16–5–2
| Redskins lose 1945 NFL Championship.
|-
| 
| Tie 1–1
| style="| Redskins  27–10
| style="| Eagles  28–24
| Redskins  17–6–2
| 
|-
| 
| style="| 
| style="| Eagles  45–42
| style="| Eagles  38–14
| Redskins  17–8–2
| Eagles lose 1947 NFL Championship.
|-
| 
| style="| 
| style="| Eagles  45–0
| style="| Eagles  42–21
| Redskins  17–10–2
| Eagles win 1948 NFL Championship.
|-
| 
| style="| 
| style="| Eagles  49–14
| style="| Eagles  44–21
| Redskins  17–12–2
|  Eagles win 1949 NFL Championship.
|-

|-
| 
| style="| 
| style="| Eagles  35–3
| style="| Eagles  33–0
| Redskins  17–14–2
| Eagles win eight straight meetings (1947–50).
|-
| 
| Tie 1–1
| style="| Redskins  27–23
| style="| Eagles  35–21
| Redskins  18–15–2
| 
|-
| 
| Tie 1–1
| style="| Eagles  38–20
| style="| Redskins  27–21
| Redskins  19–16–2
| 
|-
| 
| style="| 
|Tie  21–21
| style="| Redskins  10–0
| Redskins  20–16–3
| 
|-
| 
| style="| 
| style="| Eagles  41–33
| style="| Eagles  49–21
| Redskins  20–18–3
| 
|-
| 
| style="| 
| style="| Redskins  31–30
| style="| Redskins  34–31
| Redskins  22–18–3 
| 
|-
| 
| Tie 1–1
| style="| Eagles  13–9
| style="| Redskins  19–17
| Redskins  23–19–3 
| 
|-
| 
| Tie 1–1
| style="| Eagles  21–12
| style="| Redskins  42–7
| Redskins  24–20–3 
| 
|-
| 
| style="| 
| style="| Redskins  24–14
| style="| Redskins  20–0
| Redskins  26–20–3 
| Eagles move to Franklin Field.
|-
| 
| style="| 
| style="| Eagles  30–23
| style="| Eagles  34–14
| Redskins  26–22–3
| 
|-

|-
| 
| style="| 
| style="| Eagles  19–13
| style="| Eagles  38–28
| Redskins  26–24–3
| Eagles win 1960 NFL Championship.
|-
| 
| style="| 
| style="| Eagles  14–7
| style="| Eagles  27–24
| Tie  26–26–3
| Redskins open Robert F. Kennedy Memorial Stadium (then known as District of Columbia Stadium).
|-
| 
| Tie 1–1
| style="| Redskins  27–21
| style="| Eagles  37–14
| Tie  27–27–3
| 
|-
| 
| Tie 1–1
| style="| Redskins  13–10
| style="| Eagles  37–24
| Tie  28–28–3
| Eagles take their only lead in series meetings to date.
|-
| 
| style="| 
| style="| Redskins  35–20
| style="| Redskins  21–10
| Redskins  30–28–3 
| 
|-
| 
| Tie 1–1
| style="| Eagles  23–21
| style="| Redskins  21–10
| Redskins  31–29–3
| 
|-
| 
| Tie 1–1
| style="| Redskins  27–13
| style="| Eagles  37–28
| Redskins  32–30–3
| 
|-
| 
| style="| 
| style="| Eagles  35–24
| Tie  35–35
| Redskins  32–31–4 
| 
|-
| 
| style="| 
| style="| Redskins  16–10
| style="| Redskins  17–14
| Redskins  34–31–4 
| 
|-
| 
| style="| 
| style="| Redskins  34–29
| Tie  28–28
| Redskins  35–31–5 
| 
|-

|-
| 
| style="| 
| style="| Redskins  33–21
| style="| Redskins  24–6
| Redskins  37–31–5 
| Both teams were placed in the NFC East after the AFL-NFL merger.
|-
| 
| style="| 
| style="| Redskins  20–13
| Tie  7–7
| Redskins  38–31–6 
| Eagles open Veterans Stadium.
|-
| 
| style="| 
| style="| Redskins  23–7
| style="| Redskins  14–0
| Redskins  40–31–6 
| Redskins lose Super Bowl VII.
|-
| 
| style="| 
| style="| Redskins  28–7
| style="| Redskins  38–20
| Redskins  42–31–6 
| 
|-
| 
| style="| 
| style="| Redskins  27–20
| style="| Redskins  26–7
| Redskins  44–31–6 
| Redskins win seven straight meetings (1971–74) and post a 12–0–2 record in the series from 1968–74.
|-
| 
| style="| 
| style="| Eagles  26–10
| style="| Eagles  26–3
| Redskins  44–33–6 
| 
|-
| 
| style="| 
| style="| Redskins  20–17
| style="| Redskins  24–0
| Redskins  46–33–6 
|
|-
| 
| style="| 
| style="| Redskins  17–14
| style="| Redskins  23–17
| Redskins  48–33–6 
| 
|-
| 
| Tie 1–1
| style="| Eagles  17–10
| style="| Redskins  35–30
| Redskins  49–34–6
| 
|-
| 
| Tie 1–1
| style="| Eagles  28–17
| style="| Redskins  17–7
| Redskins  50–35–6
| 
|-

|-
| 
| style="| 
| style="| Eagles  24–14
| style="| Eagles  24–0
| Redskins  50–37–6
| Eagles lose Super Bowl XV.
|-
| 
| Tie 1–1
| style="| Eagles  36–13
| style="| Redskins  15–13
| Redskins  51–38–6
|
|-
| 
| style="| 
| style="| Redskins  37–34
| style="| Redskins  13–9
| Redskins  53–38–6
| Both games played despite players strike reducing the season to 9 games, Redskins win Super Bowl XVII.
|-
| 
| style="| 
| style="| Redskins  23–13
| style="| Redskins  28–24
| Redskins  55–38–6
| Redskins lose Super Bowl XVIII.
|-
| 
| Tie 1–1
| style="| Eagles  16–10
| style="| Redskins  20–0
| Redskins  56–39–6
| 
|-
| 
| Tie 1–1
| style="| Redskins  17–12
| style="| Eagles  19–6
| Redskins  57–40–6
| 
|-
| 
| style="| 
| style="| Redskins  21–14
| style="| Redskins  41–14
| Redskins  59–40–6
| 
|-
| 
| Tie 1–1
| style="| Eagles  31–27
| style="| Redskins  34–24
| Redskins  60–41–6
| Redskins win Super Bowl XXII.
|-
| 
| style="| 
| style="| Redskins  20–19
| style="| Redskins  17–10
| Redskins  62–41–6
| 
|-
| 
| Tie 1–1
| style="| Redskins  10–3
| style="| Eagles  42–37
| Redskins  63–42–6
| Game in Washington consisted of Washington up 37–35 with just over a minute left and the Eagles needing a stop on third down with no timeouts from the Eagles' 23-yard line. However, the Eagles swung the game on the next three plays from scrimmage. Eagles' Wes Hopkins proceeded to recover a Gerald Riggs' fumble down to the Redskins' 4-yard line. The Eagles proceeded to score the game-winning touchdown on the very next play and sealed the game with Jerome Brown stripping Mark Rypien and Reggie White recovering the forced fumble on Washington's first play from scrimmage after the Eagles took the lead. 
|-

|-
| 
| Tie 1–1
| style="| Eagles  28-14
| style="| Redskins  13-7
| Redskins  64–43–6
| Game in Philadelphia became known as the "Body Bag Game" in which nine Redskins players left the game with injuries, and an Eagles player reacted to one of those injured Redskins by yelling, "Do you guys need any more body bags?"
|- style="background:#f2f2f2; font-weight:bold;"
|  1990 Playoffs
| style="| 
| style="| Redskins  20–6
| 
|  Redskins  65–43–6
|  NFC Wild Card playoffs.  Only playoff meeting between the two teams.
|-
| 
| Tie 1–1
| style="| Eagles  24–22
| style="| Redskins  23–0
| Redskins  66–44–6
| Eagles hand the Redskins one of their two losses all season. Redskins win Super Bowl XXVI.
|-
| 
| Tie 1–1
| style="| Eagles  17–13
| style="| Redskins  16–12
| Redskins  67–45–6
| Eagles clinched playoff berth with their home win in Week 16, while the Redskins clinched in Week 17 with help.
|-
| 
| style="| 
| style="| Eagles  34–31
| style="| Eagles  17–14
| Redskins  67–47–6
| 
|-
| 
| style="| 
| style="| Eagles  21–17
| style="| Eagles  31–29
| Redskins  67–49–6
| 
|-
| 
| style="| 
| style="| Eagles  37–34(OT)
| style="| Eagles  14–7
| Redskins  67–51–6
| 
|-
| 
| Tie 1–1
| style="| Redskins  26–21
| style="| Eagles  17–14
| Redskins  68–52–6
| Eagles win eight straight meetings (1992–96).
|-
| 
| Tie 1–1
| style="| Eagles  24–10
| style="| Redskins  35–32
| Redskins  69–53–6
| Redskins open FedEx Field in Landover, Maryland (then known as Jack Kent Cooke Stadium).
|-
| 
| Tie 1–1
| style="| Eagles  17–12
| style="| Redskins  28–3
| Redskins  70–54–6
| 
|-
| 
| Tie 1–1
| style="| Eagles  38–35
| style="| Redskins  20–17(OT)
| Redskins  71–55–6
| 
|-

|-
| 
| Tie 1–1
| style="| Redskins  17–14
| style="| Eagles  23–20
| Redskins  72–56–6
| 
|-
| 
| Tie 1–1
| style="| Redskins  13–3
| style="| Eagles  20–6
| Redskins  73–57–6
| 
|-
| 
| style="| 
| style="| Eagles  34–21
| style="| Eagles  37–7
| Redskins  73–59–6
| 
|-
| 
| style="| 
| style="| Eagles  27–25
| style="| Eagles  31–7
| Redskins  73–61–6
| Eagles open Lincoln Financial Field. Eagles clinch NFC East and home-field advantage with a win in Washington in Week 17.
|-
| 
| style="| 
| style="| Eagles  28–6
| style="| Eagles  17–14
| Redskins  73–63–6
| Eagles win seven straight meetings (2001–04).  Eagles lose Super Bowl XXXIX.
|-
| 
| style="| 
| style="| Redskins  31–20
| style="| Redskins  17–10
| Redskins  75–63–6
| Redskins' first season sweep of Eagles since 1986. Redskins clinch a playoff berth in Week 17 in Philadelphia.
|-
| 
| style="| 
| style="| Eagles  27–3
| style="| Eagles  21–19
| Redskins  75–65–6
| 
|-
| 
| Tie 1–1
| style="| Redskins  20–12
| style="| Eagles  33–25
| Redskins  76–66–6
| 
|-
| 
| style="| 
| style="| Redskins  23–17
| style="| Redskins  10–3
| Redskins  78–66–6
| 
|-
| 
| style="| 
| style="| Eagles  27–24
| style="| Eagles  27–17
| Redskins  78–68–6
| 
|-

|-
| 
| Tie 1–1
| style="| Redskins  17–12
| style="| Eagles  59–28
| Redskins  79–69–6
| Game in Philadelphia was Donovan McNabb's first trip back since leaving the Eagles. Their second matchup was dubbed the "Monday Night Massacre."
|-
| 
| style="| 
| style="| Eagles  34–10
| style="| Eagles  20–13
| Redskins  79–71–6
| 
|-
| 
| style="| 
| style="| Redskins  27–20
| style="| Redskins  31–6
| Redskins  81–71–6
| 
|-
| 
| style="| 
| style="| Eagles  24–16
| style="| Eagles  33–27
| Redskins  81–73–6
| 
|-
| 
| Tie 1–1
| style="| Eagles  37–34
| style="| Redskins  27–24
| Redskins  82–74–6
| Redskins' home win in Week 16 eliminates the Eagles from playoff contention.
|-
| 
| style="| 
| style="| Redskins  38–24
| style="| Redskins  23–20
| Redskins  84–74–6
| Redskins clinch NFC East with win in Philadelphia, and the Eagles fire Chip Kelly the day after.
|-
| 
| style="| 
| style="| Redskins  27–20
| style="| Redskins  27–22
| Redskins  86–74–6
| 
|-
| 
| style="| 
| style="| Eagles  34–24
| style="| Eagles  30–17
| Redskins  86–76–6
| Eagles win Super Bowl LII.
|-
| 
| style="| 
| style="| Eagles  28–13
| style="| Eagles  24–0
| Redskins  86–78–6
| Eagles clinched a wild card berth with a win in Washington and a Minnesota loss in Week 17.
|-
| 
| style="| 
| style="| Eagles  32–27
| style="| Eagles  37–27
| Redskins  86–80–6
| Eagles overcome 17–0 deficit to win at home over Washington on opening day. Greg Ward's touchdown reception with under 30 seconds remaining sealed the Eagles completing the head-to-head sweep in Landover.
|-

|-
| 
| style="| 
| style="| Washington  20–14
| style="| Washington  27–17
| Washington  88–80–6
| Redskins adopt "Washington Football Team" as a temporary nickname. Washington overcomes a 17–0 deficit to win on opening day at home. Washington clinched the NFC East title in their win in Philadelphia in week 17.
|-
| 
| style="| 
| style="| Eagles  27–17
| style="| Eagles  20–16
| Washington  88–82–6
| The game in Philadelphia was postponed two days Sunday but moved to Tuesday due to a COVID-19 outbreak among Washington players/personnel. Eagles clinch playoff berth with their win in Washington while eliminating Washington from contention.
|-
| 
|  Tie 1–1
| style="| Commanders   32–21 
| style="| Eagles  24–8
| Commanders  89–83–6
| Washington Football Team adopts the "Commanders" name. Commanders win in Philadelphia ends Eagles’ 8–0 start to the season. Eagles lose Super Bowl LVII.
|- 

|-   
| Regular season
| style="|Commanders 88–83–6
| Commanders 43–42–3
| Commanders 45–41–3
| 
|-
| Postseason
| style="|Commanders 1–0
| Commanders 1–0
| no games
| 1990 NFC Wild Card round
|-
| Regular and postseason 
| style="|Commanders 89–83–6
| Commanders 44–42–3
| Commanders 45–41–3
| 
|-

References 

National Football League rivalries
Washington Commanders
Philadelphia Eagles
Philadelphia Eagles rivalries
Washington Commanders rivalries